Sharp Peak (Chinese: 蚺蛇尖), or Nam She Tsim, is a hill inside Sai Kung East Country Park, north of Tai Long Wan, in the Sai Kung Peninsula in Hong Kong. The hill is reasonably hard for hikers because of its steep rocky terrain and should only be attempted in good weather with correct equipment.

See also
 List of mountains, peaks and hills in Hong Kong
Three Sharp Peaks of Hong Kong
High Junk Peak
Castle Peak

References

Mountains, peaks and hills of Hong Kong
Sai Kung Peninsula